Evylena Nunn Miller (July 4, 1888February 25, 1966) was an American artist known for her paintings of Western landscapes and Native American pueblos. She wrote a book on the latter titled Travel Tree, and later served on the board of directors of the Bowers Museum. Her work is considered part of the California Scene Painting movement.

Early life
Miller was born on July 4, 1888, in Mayfield, Kansas. She moved to California in 1903 and graduated from Santa Ana High School in 1908. She attended Occidental College before transferring to Pomona College and later earning a teaching certificate from the University of California, Los Angeles.

Career

In the 1910s, Miller taught art at Claremont High School, Riverside Girls High School and Santa Ana High School. She subsequently moved to Japan where she taught at a boys' school and studied under . She returned to the United States in 1923 and married Howard Earl Miller.

Her work was exhibited widely, including at the Smithsonian Institution.

She joined the board of directors of the Bowers Museum in 1956, and died ten years later.

References

Bibliography

 

1888 births
1966 deaths
20th-century American painters
20th-century American women artists
American women painters
American landscape painters
Painters from California
Painters from Kansas
Pomona College alumni